Vladimir Yefimovich Tsigal (Russian: Владимир Ефимович Цигаль; 17 September 1917, Odesa  4 July 2013, Moscow) was a Soviet sculptor.

Biography 
Vladimir Tsigal was born on 17 September 1917, in Odesa to a Jewish family. His father was an engineer named Yefim, and his mother was Adela. He had an older brother named Victor. In 1930, his family moved to Moscow and he began his studies at the Surikov Art Institute in 1937. He interrupted his studies in 1942 to volunteer in the Eastern Front of the World War II.

During World War II, Tsigal served as an artist in the Soviet Navy, working with the Black Sea and Baltic Fleets. In 1945 he moved to Berlin, where he built monuments to the Red  Army with Lev Kerbel. He collaborated in monuments at Tiergarten among others.

After returning to Moscow in 1946, he resumed his studies at the Surikov Art Institute and received his sculptor diploma in 1948. He married Elizaveta Ignatskaya and had two children, Alexander (1948) and Tatyana (1951).

Tsigal became a member of the Artists' Union of the USSR since 1943, the Art Council of the Ministry of Culture since 1950, and the Communist Party of the Soviet Union in 1952.

Vladimir Tsigal died in Moscow in and was buried at the Novodevichy Cemetery.

Works 
Throughout his career, Tsigal created numerous monumental works that can be found in Russia and other countries. His most famous works include the monument to Richard Sorge and the monument to Lieutenant General Dmitry Karbyshev who was killed in a Nazi concentration camp.

Titles and awards 

 State Stalin Prize (1950)
 Lenin Prize (1984)
 Honored Artist of the RSFSR (1961)
  (1965)
  (1968)
   (1978)
 Order of the Patriotic War (1985)
 Order of the Red Banner of Labour (1987)
 Order of Friendship of Peoples (1993)
 Order of Honour (2002)
 Order "For Merit to the Fatherland" (2007, 2012)
 Medal "For Courage" (1943)
 Meritorious Activist of Culture (1974)
 Friendship Order (1998)

Gallery

References

External links 

1917 births
2013 deaths
Artists from Odesa
Odesa Jews
Soviet sculptors
Stalin Prize winners
Lenin Prize winners
Recipients of the Order of the Red Banner of Labour
Communist Party of the Soviet Union members
Honored Artists of the RSFSR
Burials at Novodevichy Cemetery